Qurbançı (also, Dagkurbanchi, Dag-Kurbanchy, Kurbanchi, and Kurbanchy) is a village and municipality in the Gobustan Rayon of Azerbaijan.  It has a population of 694.  The municipality consists of the villages of Qurbançı and Çay Qurbançı.

References 

Populated places in Gobustan District